Straža na Drini (Watch on the Drina) is a 1942 documentary and fascist propaganda war film directed by Branko Marjanović. The film was edited from the episodes of the weekly Ustasha newsreel. Along with the number of other films, it received a bronze diploma at the 1942 Venice Film Festival, attended only by the Axis countries (and later mostly not taken into consideration, because it even did not take place in Venice).

References

External links 
 

Croatian documentary films
1942 films
Nazi propaganda films
Croatian-language films
Documentary films about World War II
Articles containing video clips
1942 documentary films
Croatian black-and-white films
Black-and-white documentary films
Documentary films about Yugoslavia
Documentary films about Croatia